L'Enchanteur Alcofribas, sold in the United States as Alcofrisbas, the Master Magician and in Britain as The Enchanter, is a 1903 French short silent film by Georges Méliès. It was sold by Méliès's Star Film Company and is numbered 514–516 in its catalogues.

The magician's name, variously spelled Alcofribas or Alcofrisbas, is derived from Alcofrybas Nasier, a character in the book Pantagruel (and a near-anagram of François Rabelais, the book's author). Méliès himself stars as Alcofrisbas; the woman whose head appears in closeup, sometimes misidentified as Jehanne d'Alcy, is unknown. The film's special effects include pyrotechnics, a waterfall, substitution splices, multiple exposures, and dissolves.

References

External links
 

French black-and-white films
Films directed by Georges Méliès
French silent short films
1903 films
Adaptations of works by François Rabelais
1900s French films